Fort Allen may refer to:

Military bases:
 Fort Allen, a defunct military base in Pennsylvania
 Fort Allen, an active Puerto Rico National Guard military base
 Fort Allen (Maine), a former fort in Munjoy Hill, Portland, Maine

Other uses:
 Fort Allen Park, a public park on the site of the former fort in Portland, Maine
 Fort Allen, a school district in western Pennsylvania